Æthelric is thought to have  succeeded his father, Æthelmund, as Ealdorman of Hwicce. In 804 Æthelric issued a charter in which he gave land to his mother, Ceolburh, presumably Æthelmund's widow.

See also
Hwicce

External links 
 
anglo-saxon.net

Anglo-Saxon ealdormen
9th-century English people